Helena Valley West Central is a census-designated place (CDP) in Lewis and Clark County, Montana, United States. The population was 7,883 at the 2010 census. It is part of the Helena Micropolitan Statistical Area.

Geography
Helena Valley West Central is located in southern Lewis and Clark County at  (46.653748, -112.043667). It is bordered to the south by the city of Helena, the state capital. It is bordered to the southwest by the Helena West Side CDP, to the east by the Helena Valley Northeast CDP, and to the north by the Helena Valley Northwest CDP, all unincorporated areas. Interstate 15 forms the eastern border of the Helena Valley West Central CDP, with access from Exit 200 (East Lincoln Road).

Demographics

As of the census of 2000, there were 6,983 people, 2,555 households, and 1,992 families residing in the CDP. The population density was 262.1 people per square mile (101.2/km2). There were 2,667 housing units at an average density of 100.1/sq mi (38.6/km2). The racial makeup of the CDP was 96.79% White, 0.16% African American, 1.42% Native American, 0.24% Asian, 0.06% Pacific Islander, 0.36% from other races, and 0.97% from two or more races. Hispanic or Latino of any race were 0.97% of the population.

There were 2,555 households, out of which 40.1% had children under the age of 18 living with them, 66.1% were married couples living together, 7.5% had a female householder with no husband present, and 22.0% were non-families. 18.2% of all households were made up of individuals, and 5.2% had someone living alone who was 65 years of age or older. The average household size was 2.73 and the average family size was 3.09.

In the CDP, the population was spread out, with 29.1% under the age of 18, 6.2% from 18 to 24, 28.2% from 25 to 44, 27.3% from 45 to 64, and 9.3% who were 65 years of age or older. The median age was 38 years. For every 100 females, there were 99.7 males. For every 100 females age 18 and over, there were 98.5 males.

The median income for a household in the CDP was $43,881, and the median income for a family was $51,024. Males had a median income of $37,780 versus $23,703 for females. The per capita income for the CDP was $18,920. About 4.5% of families and 6.4% of the population were below the poverty line, including 8.3% of those under age 18 and 3.1% of those age 65 or over.

References

Census-designated places in Lewis and Clark County, Montana
Census-designated places in Montana
Helena, Montana micropolitan area